is a Japanese rower. He competed in the men's single sculls event at the 1984 Summer Olympics.

References

1959 births
Living people
Japanese male rowers
Olympic rowers of Japan
Rowers at the 1984 Summer Olympics
Place of birth missing (living people)
Asian Games medalists in rowing
Rowers at the 1982 Asian Games
Rowers at the 1986 Asian Games
Asian Games silver medalists for Japan
Medalists at the 1982 Asian Games
Medalists at the 1986 Asian Games